Snowboarding, known in Japan as  (part of the Simple 1500 series), and in Europe as Snowboard Racer, is a snowboarding video game developed by Atelier Double and published by D3 Publisher and A1 Games in 2000, and by Midas Interactive Entertainment in 2003, both for PlayStation.

Reception

The game received unfavorable reviews. In Japan, Famitsu gave it a score of 25 out of 40.

See also

 List of PlayStation games (M–Z)
 List of snowboarding video games

References

External links
 

2000 video games
Atelier Double games
D3 Publisher games
Multiplayer and single-player video games
PlayStation (console) games
PlayStation (console)-only games
Snowboarding video games
Video games developed in Japan